The 2021 Conference USA men's basketball tournament was the concluding event of the 2020–21 Conference USA (C-USA) men's basketball season. It was held from March 10–13, 2021 alongside the C-USA women's tournament in Frisco, Texas, at the Ford Center at The Star. In the first round and quarterfinals, two games were played simultaneously within the same arena, with the courts separated by a curtain.

Seeds

Schedule

Rankings denote tournament seed.

Bracket

* denotes overtime period.

Notes

References

See also
 2021 Conference USA women's basketball tournament

2020–21 Conference USA men's basketball season
Conference USA men's basketball tournament
College sports tournaments in Texas
Sports in Frisco, Texas
Conference USA men's basketball tournament
Basketball competitions in Texas